This is a list of films which have placed number one at the weekend box office in the United States during 1993.

Number-one films

Highest-grossing films

Calendar gross
Highest-grossing films of 1993 by Calendar Gross

In-year release

See also
 List of American films — American films by year
 Lists of box office number-one films

References

Chronology

1993
United States
1993 in American cinema
1993-related lists